In destructive testing (or destructive physical analysis, DPA) tests are carried out to the specimen's failure, in order to understand a specimen's performance or material behavior under different loads.  These tests are generally much easier to carry out, yield more information, and are easier to interpret than nondestructive testing. Destructive testing is most suitable, and economic, for objects which will be mass-produced, as the cost of destroying a small number of specimens is negligible. It is usually not economical to do destructive testing where only one or very few items are to be produced (for example, in the case of a building). Analyzing and documenting the destructive failure mode is often accomplished using a high-speed camera recording continuously (movie-loop) until the failure is detected. Detecting the failure can be accomplished using a sound detector or stress gauge which produces a signal to trigger the high-speed camera.  These high-speed cameras have advanced recording modes to capture almost any type of destructive failure.  After the failure the high-speed camera will stop recording.  The captured images can be played back in slow motion showing precisely what happens before, during and after the destructive event, image by image.

Methods and techniques

Testing of large structures

Building structures or large nonbuilding structures (such as dams and bridges) are rarely subjected to destructive testing due to the prohibitive cost of constructing a building, or a scale model of a building, just to destroy it.

Earthquake engineering requires a good understanding of how structures will perform at earthquakes. Destructive tests are more frequently carried out for structures which are to be constructed in earthquake zones. Such tests are sometimes referred to as crash tests, and they are carried out to verify the designed seismic performance of a new building, or the actual performance of an existing building. The tests are, mostly, carried out on a platform called a shake-table which is designed to shake in the same manner as an earthquake. Results of those tests often include the corresponding shake-table videos.

Testing of structures in earthquakes is increasingly done by modelling the structure using specialist finite element software.

Software testing

Destructive software testing is a type of software testing which attempts to cause a piece of software to fail in an uncontrolled manner, in order to test its robustness and to help establish range limits, within which the software will operate in a stable and reliable manner.

Automotive testing

Automobiles are subject to crash testing by both automobile manufactures and a variety of agencies.

Aircraft testing

There has also been extensive destructive testing of passenger and military aircraft, conducted by aircraft manufacturers and organizations like NASA. The 2012 Boeing 727 crash experiment was conducted and filmed by the Discovery channel. It is now standard procedure to test to destruction the first few production models of new airplanes by loading various components until they fail.  The 1951 movie, No Highway in the Sky starring James Stewart and Marlene Dietrich told the story of an eccentric engineer who pioneered research into destructive testing of complete components against a great deal of skepticism.

See also
 Crash test
 Hardness tests
 Median lethal dose
 Metallographic test
 Nondestructive testing
 Reproducibility
 Show and Display
 Stress tests
 Testability

Notes

Mechanical tests
Earthquake engineering
Product testing

de:Werkstoffprüfung